Vane Featherston (1864–1948) was an English theatre actress.

She debuted at the Olympic Theatre, and had small roles in plays in other London theatres, initially as "Miss Vane". As her career progressed, she used the name "Miss Vane Featherston". In 1884, she joined Charles Hawtrey's company. She was eventually signed to a three-year engagement. Featherston has 33 credits listed in the book The London Stage 1890–1899: A Calendar of Productions, Performers, and Personnel alone. She also appeared in a number of Broadway plays from 1905 to 1922 and the film The Brass Bottle (1914).

On 16 August 1884, her image was published on the cover of Illustrated Sporting and Dramatic News. There are two photographs of her in the National Portrait Gallery, London.

References

External links
cover The Illustrated Sporting & Dramatic News cover Saturday August 16, 1884

1864 births
1948 deaths
English stage actresses